is a Japanese footballer currently playing as a midfielder for Nankatsu SC.

Career statistics

Club
.

Notes

See also
Football in Japan

References

External links

1996 births
Living people
Association football people from Tokyo
Ryutsu Keizai University alumni
Japanese footballers
Japanese expatriate footballers
Association football midfielders
Japan Football League players
National Premier Leagues players
J3 League players
Roasso Kumamoto players
Japanese expatriate sportspeople in Australia
Expatriate soccer players in Australia